Hotel Hoppa is a network of bus services owned and operated by Rotala, connecting major hotels near Heathrow Airport with Terminals 1-3 and Terminal 5. A free shuttle service links Terminal 4 with Terminals 1–3. It operates eleven routes. The business became part of Rotala at the end of 2017, following its acquisition from National Express. It is operated under Rotala's Hallmark Connections brand.

History
The network was originally operated with a fleet of 1997 built Wright Crusader bodied Volvo B6LEs, which were painted in National Express circles livery with the red replaced by light blue. In 2008 these were replaced by 32 Alexander Dennis Enviro200 Darts painted in National Express white and grey livery. In 2019 5 Wright Streetlite DFs were added to the fleet.

Fares and competition
Hotel Hoppa fares start at £5.00 per adult for a single and £10.00 for a return. There is a 50p surcharge per journey to buy a ticket on the bus. Up to two children per adult are free.

The alternative is London Transport buses with most area hotels reached for the price of a standard bus fare.

References

External links
Hotel Hoppa website

Buildings and structures at Heathrow Airport
London bus operators
National Express companies
Rotala
Transport in the London Borough of Hillingdon
Transport in London
Bus routes in London